Kristi Angus (born August 21, 1971 in Kelowna, British Columbia) is a Canadian actress who has appeared as a guest star in episodic roles in TV series, such as The Twilight Zone, Earth: Final Conflict, Total Recall 2070 or Instant Star. Angus has also played supporting roles in feature films such as Jason X and White Chicks and also appeared in the TV series KidZone as herself in 2000.

Angus has also appeared in several commercials, including spots for Mars candy bars and Orbit chewing gum. She has gained popularity for her portrayal as the angry girlfriend in the comical Orbit gum for strong teeth commercial, in which she destroys her boyfriend's property with her teeth.

Angus is involved with the comedy troupes Face Full of Theatre and The Chesterfields appearing in many projects including Sketch With Kevin MacDonald and The Flaws of Attraction.

Angus appeared in TV movies When Love Is Not Enough: The Lois Wilson Story and Harriet the Spy in 2010. Angus recently had guest star roles on the TV shows Mayday, Living in Your Car, Lost Girl, the Syfy show Warehouse 13, the comedy series Good Dog, Really Me and King. She will appear in the 2nd season of XIII: The Series as Mischa Martin.

Filmography

Film

Television

Web

References

External links
 

1971 births
Living people
Canadian television actresses
Actresses from British Columbia
People from Kelowna
20th-century Canadian actresses
21st-century Canadian actresses
Canadian film actresses